Tonio Teklić (born 9 September 1999)  is a Croatian footballer who plays as an attacking midfielder for NK Varaždin in the Prva HNL.

Club career
Teklić was born in Split to a family originally from Livno and living in the suburb Solin. He began his youth career at the local NK Solin and quickly moved to the new-founded Adriatic Split where he spent 5 years at the youth levels winning various tournaments and individual awards. In the summer of 2015, Teklić, alongside many of his Adriatic teammates signed youth contracts with Hajduk Split. He established himself throughout the Hajduk B squad and got called-up for senior squad league match of Hajduk against Lokomotiva Zagreb, where he entered as a substitute in the 46th minute, replacing Savvas Gentsoglou.

Teklić became a permanent part of the first-team squad at the beginning of 2019.

References

External links
 
Tonio Teklić at Hajduk Split's website

1999 births
Living people
People from Solin
Footballers from Split, Croatia
Association football midfielders
Croatian footballers
Croatia youth international footballers
HNK Hajduk Split II players
HNK Hajduk Split players
NK Varaždin (2012) players
NK Hrvatski Dragovoljac players
Croatian Football League players
First Football League (Croatia) players